Žamberk is a town in Ústí nad Orlicí District in the Pardubice Region of the Czech Republic. It has about 5,900 inhabitants. The historic town centre is well preserved and is protected by law as an urban monument zone.

Administrative parts
Žamberk is made up of one administrative part.

Geography
It lies in the Podorlická Uplands. The Divoká Orlice river flows through the town.

History

Žamberk was founded in the second half of the 13th century, during the colonization of this region. It predecessor was a Slavic settlement on the trade route from Moravia to Kłodzko Land. The first written mention of Žamberk is from 1332 under its German name Senftenberg. Soon after, the Czech name began to be used, which testifies to the majority of the Czech population.

In the middle of the 14th century, Žamberk was divided between the estates of Litice and Žampach with different owners. As a part of the Litice estate, it was owned by the Pernštejn family and Ernest of Bavaria. In 1563, it was acquired by Mikuláš of Bubna of Litice. In 1575, he bought the second part of Žamberk and merged the two parts. In 1575–1600, he has a castle built here and since then it is known as Žamberk estate. The Bubna of Litice family owned the estate until 1809.

Demographics

Sights

The historic centre is formed by Masarykovo Square and adjacent streets. The main landmark of the square is the town hall. It is a Neoclassical building from 1810. In the midle of the square are Marian column from the late 17th century and the fountain with sculptures of a nymph and a centaur.

The Church of Saint Wencleslaus is the highest building in the town. Its existence was first mentioned in 1348.

The Žamberk Castle is a Renaissance building that includes the Chapel of the Assumption of the Virgin Mary and a castle park, probably founded in the 19th century. The castle is inaccessible to the public.

The Jewish cemetery was established in around 1700 and today there is a small exposition on Jewish population in the town.

Notable people
Prokop Diviš (1698–1765), inventor, catholic priest
Theodor Brorsen (1819–1895), Danish astronomer and botanist; worked here
Eduard Albert (1841–1900), Austrian surgeon, professor and historian
Václav F. Kumpošt (1846–1874), founder of the Vesmír magazine
August Seydler (1849–1891), astronomer, theoretical physicist and professor
Jan Vilímek (1860–1938), illustrator and painter
Josef Ježek (1884–1969), politician
Oldřich Marek (1911–1986), entomologist and teacher; worked here
Petr Eben (1929–2007), composer

Twin towns – sister cities

Žamberk is twinned with:

 Fresagrandinaria, Italy
 Nowa Sól, Poland
 Püttlingen, Germany
 Rice Lake, United States
 Saint-Michel-sur-Orge, France
 Senftenberg, Germany
 Senftenberg, Austria
 Veszprém, Hungary

Žamberk also has friendly relations with Miharu in Japan.

Gallery

References

External links

Cities and towns in the Czech Republic
Populated places in Ústí nad Orlicí District